Crome syndrome is a rare disease defined by various symptoms, including epilepsy, intellectual disability, eye and kidney problems. It usually causes death in 4 to 8 months.

History
In 1963, a doctor studied two female infants who showed symptoms of intellectual disability, congenital cataracts, epileptic seizures and small stature. The two girls died at the age of 4 and 8 months. The autopsy revealed renal tubular necrosis and encephalopathy.

References

External links 

Syndromes affecting the eye
Rare syndromes
Syndromes affecting stature